Munkhbolor Ganbold (Mongolian: Ганболдын Мөнхболор), also known as Munkkh, is a Mongolian contemporary artist who was one of the participating artists of the Mongolia Pavilion — Lost in Tngri at the 57th La Biennale di Venezia.

Early life and education 
Born in 1983 in Ulaanbaatar, artist Munkkh represents a generation of Mongolian artists, who grew up during harsh transition, a period of chaotic shifts in Mongolia's society in 1990s. His father Ganbold was a painter, who never realized the potential of his son as an artist. Munkkh's decision for becoming an artist was partially related with his father's ignorance. He obtained his education from Green Horse Mongolian Contemporary Art College, followed by Mongolian University of Fine Arts and Culture, Ulaanbaatar and later from Muthesius Fine Art College, Kiel, Germany.

Professional career and artworks 
After his study in Germany, Munkkh moved to Stockholm, where he stayed for 5 years. His first solo exhibitions appeared in Edsvik Konsthall, Sergels Torg and Gallery Haengmattan, Stockholm, Sweden. In 2012, he returned to Ulaanbaatar. Initially he joined Blue Sun Contemporary Art Group. Later in 2013, Munkkh together with his friends, multi-disciplinary artists Dorjderem Davaa, Davaajargal Tsaschikher and Gantulga Jargalnasan, established the Mongolian contemporary art movement, Human Nature Love Freedom. Until 2019, the group has been working together, showed 12 series of works in various public spaces and exhibition halls.

Since he moved to Mongolia, Munkkh's works have been displayed in Mongolia, the United States, Italy, Korea, Taiwan, China ad Germany. His works incorporates materials and objects found on the streets, construction sites and wasteland. Sometimes he destroys his works, uses torn pieces for the collage. In 2017, he was invited to represent Mongolia at the 57th La Biennale di Venezia. Titled Karma of Eating (2016), Munkhbolor's installation was about "the damages on the Mongolian ecosystem, especially those caused by the overbreeding of goats for the cashmere business".

Notable exhibitions

Solo exhibitions 
2017 Dream of Blue Grass, at Art Space 976+, Ulaanbaatar, Mongolia

2015 Adjective, at Art Space 976+, Ulaanbaatar, Mongolia

Group exhibitions 
2018 In/Is Land, at Kuandu Museum of Fine Art, Taipei, Taiwan

2018 Beyond Heaven and Earth: Mongolian Art in This Day and Age, at China Art Museum, Shanghai, China

2013 Amalgamated, at Gallery MC, New York, USA

References

External links 
 Art Space 976+
 Lost in Tngri

Mongolian artists
1983 births
Living people